Marloes Horst is a Dutch fashion model.

Career
Horst started her career with IMG Models before switching to Next Management in 2009. She then debuted walking for Prada and appearing in a fragrance campaign for Valentino. After having struggles in London and Paris, Horst moved to New York City. In 2010, she appeared in the Pirelli calendar photographed by Terry Richardson. She also walked for Chanel that year.

In 2014, Horst appeared as a rookie in the Sports Illustrated Swimsuit Issue in which her photoshoot took place in Madagascar.

Horst has appeared in advertisements for Adidas, Calvin Klein, Diesel, H&M, Joe Fresh, Carolina Herrera, DKNY and Donna Karan, Nine West, Emporio Armani, Levi's, Stella McCartney, Ralph Lauren, Kenzo, and Tommy Hilfiger among others. Horst has been a Maybelline spokesmodel.

Personal life 
Horst is married to the American model agency director Jason Valenta. On May 23, 2021, they announced the birth of their son.

References 

1989 births
Living people
Dutch female models
People from Friesland
Next Management models